Little Habton is a hamlet and former civil parish, now currently in the parish of Habton, in the Ryedale district of North Yorkshire, England. In 1961, it had a population of 59.

History 
The name "Habton" means 'Hab(b)a's farm/settlement'. Little Habton was recorded in the Domesday Book as Abbetune/Abetune/Habetun. Litle Habton was formerly a township in the parish of Kirby Misperton, from 1866, Little Habton was a civil parish in its own right, on 1 April 1986 the parish was abolished and merged with Great Habton and Ryton to form Habton.

References

Hamlets in North Yorkshire
Former civil parishes in North Yorkshire
Ryedale